DWWL (92.7 FM), broadcasting as 92.7 Beecool FM, is a radio station owned and operated by Peñafrancia Broadcasting Corporation. Its studios and transmitter are located Zone 1, Brgy. San Agustin, Canaman.

Legazpi Station
The call letters formerly belonged to its sister station (98.7 FM) in Legazpi, Albay, which was inaugurated in 2010 as Wow FM. Back then, it was located at the 3rd floor, Rivero Bldg., Capt. F. Aquende Dr., Brgy. Bagumbayan. In 2015, the station went off the air when its station manager, Johnny Dematera, died. Since then, the call letters were transferred to its station in Naga.

In 2019, it returned on air as Kadunong News FM and transferred its operations to Maharlika Highway, Purok 3, Brgy. San Rafael, Guinobatan. It was given a Provisional Authority. Later that year, it was rebranded as Beecool FM.

References

Radio stations in Naga, Camarines Sur
Radio stations established in 2019